The 1996 San Francisco Giants season was the Giants' 114th season in Major League Baseball, their 39th season in San Francisco since their move from New York following the 1957 season, and their 37th at 3Com Park at Candlestick Point. The team finished in fourth place in the National League West with a 68–94 record,  23 games behind the San Diego Padres.

Offseason
 October 6, 1995: Mike Benjamin was traded by the Giants to the Philadelphia Phillies for Jeff Juden and Tommy Eason (minors).
 October 26, 1995: John Roper was claimed off waivers from the Giants by the Cincinnati Reds.
 December 1, 1995: Rikkert Faneyte was sent to the Texas Rangers by the San Francisco Giants as part of a conditional deal.
 March 26, 1996: Scott Service was released by the Giants.

Regular season

Opening day starters

Season standings

Record vs. opponents

Game log

|- bgcolor="ffbbbb"
| 1 || April 1 || @ Braves || 8–10 || Maddux || Leiter (0–1) || Borbon || 48,961 || 0–1
|- bgcolor="ffbbbb"
| 2 || April 3 || @ Braves || 2–15 || Glavine || VanLandingham (0–1) || — || 28,728 || 0–2
|- bgcolor="ccffcc"
| 3 || April 4 || @ Braves || 7–1 || Watson (1–0) || Smoltz || — || 30,271 || 1–2
|- bgcolor="ccffcc"
| 4 || April 5 || @ Marlins || 7–1 || Fernandez (1–0) || Rapp || — || 24,769 || 2–2
|- bgcolor="ffbbbb"
| 5 || April 6 || @ Marlins || 0–1 (10) || Nen || Dewey (0–1) || — || 34,002 || 2–3
|- bgcolor="ccffcc"
| 6 || April 7 || @ Marlins || 14–7 || Bourgeois (1–0) || Burkett || — || 19,842 || 3–3
|- bgcolor="ffbbbb"
| 7 || April 8 || @ Astros || 2–6 || Hampton || VanLandingham (0–2) || — || 13,488 || 3–4
|- bgcolor="ccffcc"
| 8 || April 9 || @ Astros || 3–1 (10) || Juden (1–0) || Tabaka || Beck (1) || 13,588 || 4–4
|- bgcolor="ccffcc"
| 9 || April 10 || @ Astros || 11–5 || Fernandez (2–0) || Kile || — || 14,183 || 5–4
|- bgcolor="ccffcc"
| 10 || April 12 || Cubs || 4–1 || Leiter (1–1) || Navarro || Beck (2) || 45,589 || 6–4
|- bgcolor="ccffcc"
| 11 || April 13 || Cubs || 3–2 (10) || Juden (2–0) || Myers || — || 22,120 || 7–4
|- bgcolor="ffbbbb"
| 12 || April 14 || Cubs || 2–6 || Foster || Watson (1–1) || Wendell || 23,137 || 7–5
|- bgcolor="ccffcc"
| 13 || April 16 || Dodgers || 5–3 || Dewey (1–1) || Osuna || Beck (3) || 19,716 || 8–5
|- bgcolor="ffbbbb"
| 14 || April 17 || Dodgers || 2–11 || Osuna || Leiter (1–2) || — || 17,039 || 8–6
|- bgcolor="ffbbbb"
| 15 || April 18 || @ Cubs || 6–7 || Perez || VanLandingham (0–3) || Wendell || 15,857 || 8–7
|- bgcolor="ffbbbb"
| 16 || April 19 || @ Cubs || 6–10 || Foster || Watson (1–2) || — || 17,662 || 8–8
|- bgcolor="ccffcc"
| 17 || April 20 || @ Cubs || 8–4 || Gardner (1–0) || Bullinger || — || 28,047 || 9–8
|- bgcolor="ccffcc"
| 18 || April 21 || @ Cubs || 7–6 || Fernandez (3–0) || Trachsel || Beck (4) || 28,065 || 10–8
|- bgcolor="ffbbbb"
| 19 || April 22 || Astros || 8–11 || Reynolds || Leiter (1–3) || — || 8,867 || 10–9
|- bgcolor="ffbbbb"
| 20 || April 23 || Astros || 4–8 || Kile || VanLandingham (0–4) || — || 8,439 || 10–10
|- bgcolor="ffbbbb"
| 21 || April 24 || Braves || 3–8 || Smoltz || Watson (1–3) || — || 13,296 || 10–11
|- bgcolor="ccffcc"
| 22 || April 25 || Braves || 8–0 || Gardner (2–0) || Schmidt || — || 12,436 || 11–11
|- bgcolor="ffbbbb"
| 23 || April 26 || Marlins || 0–3 || Brown || Fernandez (3–1) || — || 12,461 || 11–12
|- bgcolor="ccffcc"
| 24 || April 27 || Marlins || 6–3 || Leiter (2–3) || Burkett || Beck (5) || 15,711 || 12–12
|- bgcolor="ccffcc"
| 25 || April 28 || Marlins || 10–4 || VanLandingham (1–4) || Hammond || — || 23,535 || 13–12
|- bgcolor="ccffcc"
| 26 || April 30 || @ Padres || 9–4 || Watson (2–3) || Tewksbury || — || 14,170 || 14–12
|-

|- bgcolor="ffbbbb"
| 27 || May 1 || @ Padres || 4–9 || Valenzuela || Gardner (2–1) || — || 14,878 || 14–13
|- bgcolor="ffbbbb"
| 28 || May 3 || Reds || 3–5 || McElroy || Creek (0–1) || Brantley || 12,884 || 14–14
|- bgcolor="ffbbbb"
| 29 || May 4 || Reds || 7–9 || Moore || Leiter (2–4) || Brantley || 18,989 || 14–15
|- bgcolor="ffbbbb"
| 30 || May 5 || Reds || 6–12 || Smiley || VanLandingham (1–5) || — || 18,052 || 14–16
|- bgcolor="ccffcc"
| 31 || May 7 || @ Cardinals || 4–2 || Watson (3–3) || Fossas || Beck (6) || 23,492 || 15–16
|- bgcolor="ccffcc"
| 32 || May 8 || @ Cardinals || 10–7 || Gardner (3–1) || Benes || Beck (7) || 22,517 || 16–16
|- bgcolor="ffbbbb"
| 33 || May 9 || @ Cardinals || 8–16 || Parrett || Dewey (1–2) || — || 37,920 || 16–17
|- bgcolor="ccffcc"
| 34 || May 10 || @ Pirates || 5–4 (10) || DeLucia (1–0) || Cordova || Beck (8) || 17,611 || 17–17
|- bgcolor="ccffcc"
| 35 || May 11 || @ Pirates || 12–7 || VanLandingham (2–5) || Hope || — || 16,591 || 18–17
|- bgcolor="ccffcc"
| 36 || May 12 || @ Pirates || 7–2 || Watson (4–3) || Smith || — || 17,132 || 19–17
|- bgcolor="ccffcc"
| 37 || May 13 || @ Phillies || 2–1 || Gardner (4–1) || Fernandez || Beck (9) || 18,758 || 20–17
|- bgcolor="ffbbbb"
| 38 || May 14 || @ Phillies || 0–7 || Schilling || Fernandez (3–2) || — || 18,774 || 20–18
|- bgcolor="ffbbbb"
| 39 || May 15 || @ Phillies || 6–7 (10) || Bottalico || Beck (0–1) || — || 25,085 || 20–19
|- bgcolor="ffbbbb"
| 40 || May 18 || Mets || 5–14 || Clark || VanLandingham (2–6) || — || 15,298 || 20–20
|- bgcolor="ccffcc"
| 41 || May 19 || Mets || 1–0 || Watson (5–3) || Isringhausen || Beck (10) || — || 21–20
|- bgcolor="ccffcc"
| 42 || May 19 || Mets || 6–2 || Gardner (5–1) || Wilson || — || 22,959 || 22–20
|- bgcolor="ccffcc"
| 43 || May 20 || Expos || 9–6 || Dewey (2–2) || Dyer || Beck (11) || 10,062 || 23–20
|- bgcolor="ccffcc"
| 44 || May 21 || Expos || 8–5 || Dewey (3–2) || Aucoin || Beck (12) || 8,911 || 24–20
|- bgcolor="ffbbbb"
| 45 || May 22 || Expos || 3–4 || Martinez || VanLandingham (2–7) || Rojas || 11,663 || 24–21
|- bgcolor="ffbbbb"
| 46 || May 24 || Phillies || 1–5 || Schilling || Watson (5–4) || — || 11,917 || 24–22
|- bgcolor="ccffcc"
| 47 || May 25 || Phillies || 3–2 || Gardner (6–1) || Williams || Beck (13) || 16,874 || 25–22
|- bgcolor="ffbbbb"
| 48 || May 26 || Phillies || 1–10 || Mulholland || Fernandez (3–3) || Bottalico || 26,234 || 25–23
|- bgcolor="ffbbbb"
| 49 || May 28 || @ Mets || 0–4 || Clark || Leiter (2–5) || Henry || 15,733 || 25–24
|- bgcolor="ccffcc"
| 50 || May 29 || @ Mets || 4–2 || VanLandingham (3–7) || Isringhausen || Beck (14) || 15,578 || 26–24
|- bgcolor="ffbbbb"
| 51 || May 30 || @ Mets || 0–1 || Wilson || Watson (5–5) || Franco || 15,781 || 26–25
|- bgcolor="ffbbbb"
| 52 || May 31 || @ Expos || 4–7 || Daal || DeLucia (1–1) || Veres || 25,712 || 26–26
|-

|- bgcolor="ffbbbb"
| 53 || June 1 || @ Expos || 1–5 || Fassero || Fernandez (3–4) || Dyer || 36,858 || 26–27
|- bgcolor="ccffcc"
| 54 || June 2 || @ Expos || 8–1 || Leiter (3–5) || Martinez || — || 25,006 || 27–27
|- bgcolor="ccffcc"
| 55 || June 3 || @ Reds || 6–3 || VanLandingham (4–7) || Burba || — || 20,028 || 28–27
|- bgcolor="ffbbbb"
| 56 || June 4 || @ Reds || 1–4 || Salkeld || Watson (5–6) || Brantley || 28,549 || 28–28
|- bgcolor="ccffcc"
| 57 || June 5 || @ Reds || 15–4 || Gardner (7–1) || Jarvis || — || 21,881 || 29–28
|- bgcolor="ffbbbb"
| 58 || June 7 || Cardinals || 4–9 || Benes || Fernandez (3–5) || — || 13,009 || 29–29
|- bgcolor="ccffcc"
| 59 || June 8 || Cardinals || 4–1 || DeLucia (2–1) || Stottlemyre || Beck (15) || 20,401 || 30–29
|- bgcolor="ccffcc"
| 60 || June 9 || Cardinals || 9–0 || Watson (6–6) || Benes || — || 24,176 || 31–29
|- bgcolor="ffbbbb"
| 61 || June 10 || Pirates || 4–5 || Morel || DeLucia (2–2) || Cordova || 10,026 || 31–30
|- bgcolor="ffbbbb"
| 62 || June 11 || Pirates || 2–7 || Neagle || Fernandez (3–6) || — || 11,530 || 31–31
|- bgcolor="ccffcc"
| 63 || June 13 || Astros || 12–8 || Leiter (4–5) || Kile || — || 10,527 || 32–31
|- bgcolor="ffbbbb"
| 64 || June 14 || Astros || 1–9 || Hampton || VanLandingham (4–8) || Wagner || 10,758 || 32–32
|- bgcolor="ffbbbb"
| 65 || June 15 || Astros || 3–4 || Wall || Watson (6–7) || Jones || 18,530 || 32–33
|- bgcolor="ccffcc"
| 66 || June 16 || Astros || 8–7 || DeLucia (3–2) || Morman || — || 27,624 || 33–33
|- bgcolor="ccffcc"
| 67 || June 17 || Marlins || 1–0 || Fernandez (4–6) || Leiter || Beck (16) || 9,524 || 34–33
|- bgcolor="ccffcc"
| 68 || June 18 || Marlins || 9–8 (15) || Juden (3–0) || Rapp || — || 15,439 || 35–33
|- bgcolor="ccffcc"
| 69 || June 19 || Marlins || 7–4 (15) || Bautista (1–0) || Mathews || — || 13,274 || 36–33
|- bgcolor="ffbbbb"
| 70 || June 21 || @ Braves || 7–8 (11) || Wade || Beck (0–2) || — || 38,432 || 36–34
|- bgcolor="ffbbbb"
| 71 || June 22 || @ Braves || 0–6 || Maddux || Gardner (7–2) || — || 49,365 || 36–35
|- bgcolor="ffbbbb"
| 72 || June 23 || @ Braves || 0–1 || Glavine || Fernandez (4–7) || Wohlers || 35,645 || 36–36
|- bgcolor="ffbbbb"
| 73 || June 24 || @ Marlins || 1–2 || Burkett || Leiter (4–6) || Nen || 16,860 || 36–37
|- bgcolor="ffbbbb"
| 74 || June 25 || @ Marlins || 4–5 (10) || Powell || Beck (0–3) || — || 16,577 || 36–38
|- bgcolor="ffbbbb"
| 75 || June 26 || @ Marlins || 2–3 || Brown || Watson (6–8) || — || 21,188 || 36–39
|- bgcolor="ffbbbb"
| 76 || June 27 || Padres || 1–11 || Valenzuela || Gardner (7–3) || — || 12,325 || 36–40
|- bgcolor="ffbbbb"
| 77 || June 28 || Padres || 1–6 || Ashby || Fernandez (4–8) || Hoffman || 13,129 || 36–41
|- bgcolor="ffbbbb"
| 78 || June 29 || Padres || 6–7 || Blair || Beck (0–4) || Hoffman || 24,540 || 36–42
|- bgcolor="ffbbbb"
| 79 || June 30 || Padres || 4–7 || Tewksbury || VanLandingham (4–9) || Hoffman || 26,373 || 36–43
|-

|- bgcolor="ccffcc"
| 80 || July 1 || Rockies || 9–6 || Juden (4–0) || Painter || Beck (17) || 16,142 || 37–43
|- bgcolor="ccffcc"
| 81 || July 2 || Rockies || 5–1 || Gardner (8–3) || Ritz || — || 13,571 || 38–43
|- bgcolor="ffbbbb"
| 82 || July 3 || Rockies || 2–3 || Leskanic || Beck (0–5) || Ruffin || 44,356 || 38–44
|- bgcolor="ffbbbb"
| 83 || July 4 || @ Padres || 4–8 || Tewksbury || Leiter (4–7) || — || 14,111 || 38–45
|- bgcolor="ffbbbb"
| 84 || July 5 || @ Padres || 6–7 (11) || Bergman || Bautista (1–1) || — || 22,589 || 38–46
|- bgcolor="ffbbbb"
| 85 || July 6 || @ Padres || 3–7 || Worrell || Bourgeois (1–1) || Hoffman || 51,021 || 38–47
|- bgcolor="ffbbbb"
| 86 || July 7 || @ Padres || 3–10 || Valenzuela || Fernandez (4–9) || — || 32,693 || 38–48
|- bgcolor="ffbbbb"
| 87 || July 11 || @ Dodgers || 3–8 || Martinez || Leiter (4–8) || — || 37,305 || 38–49
|- bgcolor="ffbbbb"
| 88 || July 12 || @ Dodgers || 1–6 || Valdez || Fernandez (4–10) || — || 44,569 || 38–50
|- bgcolor="ccffcc"
| 89 || July 13 || @ Dodgers || 7–0 || Estes (1–0) || Nomo || — || 54,226 || 39–50
|- bgcolor="ccffcc"
| 90 || July 14 || @ Dodgers || 6–0 || VanLandingham (5–9) || Park || — || 42,862 || 40–50
|- bgcolor="ffbbbb"
| 91 || July 15 || @ Rockies || 3–7 || Bailey || Bourgeois (1–2) || — || 48,032 || 40–51
|- bgcolor="ffbbbb"
| 92 || July 16 || @ Rockies || 3–5 || Freeman || Leiter (4–9) || Ruffin || 49,035 || 40–52
|- bgcolor="ffbbbb"
| 93 || July 17 || @ Rockies || 3–4 || Wright || Fernandez (4–11) || Ruffin || 48,453 || 40–53
|- bgcolor="ffbbbb"
| 94 || July 18 || Dodgers || 3–8 || Nomo || Estes (1–1) || — || 28,072 || 40–54
|- bgcolor="ccffcc"
| 95 || July 19 || Dodgers || 5–4 || VanLandingham (6–9) || Candiotti || Beck (18) || 27,562 || 41–54
|- bgcolor="ccffcc"
| 96 || July 20 || Dodgers || 7–6 || Bautista (2–1) || Worrell || — || 50,014 || 42–54
|- bgcolor="ffbbbb"
| 97 || July 21 || Dodgers || 6–7 || Osuna || DeLucia (3–3) || Worrell || 36,345 || 42–55
|- bgcolor="ccffcc"
| 98 || July 22 || Cubs || 3–2 || Bautista (3–1) || Bottenfield || — || 12,902 || 43–55
|- bgcolor="ffbbbb"
| 99 || July 23 || Cubs || 6–9 || Myers || DeLucia (3–4) || Patterson || 15,878 || 43–56
|- bgcolor="ffbbbb"
| 100 || July 24 || Cubs || 1–7 || Castillo || VanLandingham (6–10) || — || 13,695 || 43–57
|- bgcolor="ccffcc"
| 101 || July 25 || Braves || 4–3 || Watson (7–8) || Maddux || Beck (19) || 16,871 || 44–57
|- bgcolor="ffbbbb"
| 102 || July 26 || Braves || 1–2 || Glavine || Leiter (4–10) || Wohlers || 17,560 || 44–58
|- bgcolor="ccffcc"
| 103 || July 27 || Braves || 7–5 || Gardner (9–3) || Woodall || Beck (20) || 38,761 || 45–58
|- bgcolor="ccffcc"
| 104 || July 28 || Braves || 10–3 || Estes (2–1) || Smoltz || Beck (21) || 34,525 || 46–58
|- bgcolor="ffbbbb"
| 105 || July 30 || @ Cubs || 0–4 || Castillo || VanLandingham (6–11) || Adams || 37,424 || 46–59
|- bgcolor="ffbbbb"
| 106 || July 31 || @ Cubs || 1–4 || Trachsel || Watson (7–9) || Wendell || 28,988 || 46–60
|-

|- bgcolor="ffbbbb"
| 107 || August 2 || @ Astros || 1–5 || Drabek || Gardner (9–4) || Hernandez || 22,682 || 46–61
|- bgcolor="ffbbbb"
| 108 || August 3 || @ Astros || 1–4 || Reynolds || Estes (2–2) || — || 35,930 || 46–62
|- bgcolor="ffbbbb"
| 109 || August 4 || @ Astros || 6–7 || Hampton || Fernandez (4–12) || Wagner || 33,646 || 46–63
|- bgcolor="ffbbbb"
| 110 || August 5 || Reds || 3–4 || Salkeld || VanLandingham (6–12) || Brantley || 12,277 || 46–64
|- bgcolor="ffbbbb"
| 111 || August 6 || Reds || 2–3 || Carrasco || Beck (0–6) || Brantley || 12,434 || 46–65
|- bgcolor="ccffcc"
| 112 || August 7 || Reds || 9–2 || Gardner (10–4) || Jarvis || — || 15,829 || 47–65
|- bgcolor="ccffcc"
| 113 || August 8 || @ Cardinals || 5–3 (10) || Poole (1–0) || Honeycutt || Beck (22) || 34,844 || 48–65
|- bgcolor="ccffcc"
| 114 || August 9 || @ Cardinals || 8–6 || Fernandez (5–12) || Morgan || Beck (23) || 30,118 || 49–65
|- bgcolor="ffbbbb"
| 115 || August 10 || @ Cardinals || 1–7 || Benes || VanLandingham (6–13) || — || 49,344 || 49–66
|- bgcolor="ffbbbb"
| 116 || August 11 || @ Cardinals || 3–5 || Osborne || Watson (7–10) || Eckersley || 30,139 || 49–67
|- bgcolor="ccffcc"
| 117 || August 13 || @ Pirates || 12–10 || Dewey (4–2) || Plesac || Beck (24) || 11,378 || 50–67
|- bgcolor="ffbbbb"
| 118 || August 14 || @ Pirates || 3–4 || Peters || Estes (2–3) || Ericks || 20,340 || 50–68
|- bgcolor="ccffcc"
| 119 || August 16 || @ Phillies || 6–4 || VanLandingham (7–13) || Williams || Beck (25) || 20,163 || 51–68
|- bgcolor="ccffcc"
| 120 || August 17 || @ Phillies || 8–4 || Watson (8–10) || Hunter || Beck (26) || 24,522 || 52–68
|- bgcolor="ffbbbb"
| 121 || August 18 || @ Phillies || 6–7 || Borland || Gardner (10–5) || Bottalico || 24,480 || 52–69
|- bgcolor="ccffcc"
| 122 || August 19 || Mets || 5–4 || Scott (1–0) || Harnisch || Beck (27) || 11,565 || 53–69
|- bgcolor="ffbbbb"
| 123 || August 20 || Mets || 3–7 || Jones || Fernandez (5–13) || Franco || 10,885 || 53–70
|- bgcolor="ccffcc"
| 124 || August 21 || Mets || 12–11 || Dewey (5–2) || Person || Beck (28) || 11,473 || 54–70
|- bgcolor="ffbbbb"
| 125 || August 22 || Expos || 4–5 || Fassero || Bautista (3–2) || Rojas || 14,744 || 54–71
|- bgcolor="ffbbbb"
| 126 || August 23 || Expos || 8–10 || Daal || Creek (0–2) || Rojas || 18,739 || 54–72
|- bgcolor="ffbbbb"
| 127 || August 24 || Expos || 0–3 || Martinez || Estes (2–4) || Rojas || 22,710 || 54–73
|- bgcolor="ccffcc"
| 128 || August 25 || Expos || 7–2 || Fernandez (6–13) || Cormier || — || 24,349 || 55–73
|- bgcolor="ccffcc"
| 129 || August 26 || Phillies || 1–0 || VanLandingham (8–13) || Schilling || Beck (29) || 8,640 || 56–73
|- bgcolor="ffbbbb"
| 130 || August 27 || Phillies || 2–3 || Williams || Bautista (3–3) || Bottalico || 9,549 || 56–74
|- bgcolor="ccffcc"
| 131 || August 28 || Phillies || 7–6 || Dewey (6–2) || Jordan || Beck (30) || 16,223 || 57–74
|- bgcolor="ccffcc"
| 132 || August 30 || @ Mets || 6–4 || Estes (3–4) || Harnisch || Beck (31) || 17,581 || 58–74
|- bgcolor="ffbbbb"
| 133 || August 31 || @ Mets || 2–7 || Person || Scott (1–1) || Henry || 23,636 || 58–75
|-

|- bgcolor="ffbbbb"
| 134 || September 1 || @ Mets || 5–6 (10) || Franco || Beck (0–7) || — || 40,643 || 58–76
|- bgcolor="ffbbbb"
| 135 || September 2 || @ Expos || 3–4 (11) || Manuel || Beck (0–8) || — || 26,689 || 58–77
|- bgcolor="ffbbbb"
| 136 || September 3 || @ Expos || 2–9 || Martinez || Gardner (10–6) || — || 20,168 || 58–78
|- bgcolor="ffbbbb"
| 137 || September 4 || @ Expos || 0–6 || Paniagua || Estes (3–5) || — || 20,317 || 58–79
|- bgcolor="ccffcc"
| 138 || September 6 || @ Reds || 2–0 || Fernandez (7–13) || Smiley || Beck (32) || — || 59–79
|- bgcolor="ffbbbb"
| 139 || September 6 || @ Reds || 1–14 || Morgan || Bourgeois (1–3) || — || 23,091 || 59–80
|- bgcolor="ffbbbb"
| 140 || September 7 || @ Reds || 5–7 || Salkeld || Scott (1–2) || Brantley || 22,790 || 59–81
|- bgcolor="ffbbbb"
| 141 || September 8 || @ Reds || 3–8 || Shaw || Bautista (3–4) || — || 20,838 || 59–82
|- bgcolor="ffbbbb"
| 142 || September 9 || Cardinals || 2–6 || Benes || Gardner (10–7) || — || 10,307 || 59–83
|- bgcolor="ffbbbb"
| 143 || September 10 || Cardinals || 0–1 || Petkovsek || Rueter (0–1) || Eckersley || 8,770 || 59–84
|- bgcolor="ccffcc"
| 144 || September 11 || Cardinals || 4–2 || Scott (2–2) || Benes || Beck (33) || 9,673 || 60–84
|- bgcolor="ffbbbb"
| 145 || September 12 || Pirates || 4–10 || Schmidt || Dewey (6–3) || Boever || 8,214 || 60–85
|- bgcolor="ffbbbb"
| 146 || September 13 || Pirates || 0–9 || Loaiza || VanLandingham (8–14) || — || 9,888 || 60–86
|- bgcolor="ffbbbb"
| 147 || September 14 || Pirates || 5–7 (12) || Ericks || Hook (0–1) || Boever || 15,685 || 60–87
|- bgcolor="ffbbbb"
| 148 || September 15 || Pirates || 1–4 || Lieber || Rueter (0–2) || Ruebel || — || 60–88
|- bgcolor="ffbbbb"
| 149 || September 15 || Pirates || 9–11 (10) || Wilkins || Poole (1–1) || — || 21,998 || 60–89
|- bgcolor="ffbbbb"
| 150 || September 16 || Padres || 1–2 (11) || Hoffman || Beck (0–9) || — || 8,853 || 60–90
|- bgcolor="ccffcc"
| 151 || September 17 || Padres || 9–7 || Poole (2–1) || Veras || Beck (34) || 12,737 || 61–90
|- bgcolor="ffbbbb"
| 152 || September 18 || Padres || 5–8 || Bochtler || DeLucia (3–5) || Hoffman || 11,996 || 61–91
|- bgcolor="ccffcc"
| 153 || September 19 || Rockies || 11–4 || VanLandingham (9–14) || Ritz || — || 10,994 || 62–91
|- bgcolor="ccffcc"
| 154 || September 20 || Rockies || 6–2 || Gardner (11–7) || Thompson || — || 15,734 || 63–91
|- bgcolor="ccffcc"
| 155 || September 21 || Rockies || 6–2 || Rueter (1–2) || Wright || — || 30,002 || 64–91
|- bgcolor="ccffcc"
| 156 || September 22 || Rockies || 7–3 || Soderstrom (1–0) || Nied || — || 30,826 || 65–91
|- bgcolor="ffbbbb"
| 157 || September 24 || @ Dodgers || 2–6 || Martinez || Watson (8–11) || — || 37,448 || 65–92
|- bgcolor="ffbbbb"
| 158 || September 25 || @ Dodgers || 5–7 || Radinsky || DeLucia (3–6) || Worrell || 42,405 || 65–93
|- bgcolor="ccffcc"
| 159 || September 26 || @ Dodgers || 6–1 || Gardner (12–7) || Candiotti || — || 38,893 || 66–93
|- bgcolor="ccffcc"
| 160 || September 27 || @ Rockies || 9–3 || Soderstrom (2–0) || Nied || — || 48,009 || 67–93
|- bgcolor="ccffcc"
| 161 || September 28 || @ Rockies || 8–5 || Carlson (1–0) || Burke || Beck (35) || 48,042 || 68–93
|- bgcolor="ffbbbb"
| 162 || September 29 || @ Rockies || 3–12 || Ritz || Watson (8–12) || — || 48,162 || 68–94
|-

|-
| Legend:       = Win       = LossBold = Giants team member

Detailed records

Notable transactions
 April 5, 1996: Steve Decker was signed as a free agent by the Giants.
 July 11, 1996: Jeff Juden was selected off waivers from the Giants by the Montreal Expos.
 July 27, 1996: Kirt Manwaring was traded by the Giants to the Houston Astros for Rick Wilkins and cash.
 July 30, 1996: Mark Leiter was traded by the Giants to the Montreal Expos for Kirk Rueter and Tim Scott.
 August 21, 1996: Steve Decker was purchased from the Giants by the Colorado Rockies.
 August 21, 1996: Trenidad Hubbard was selected off waivers by the San Francisco Giants from the Colorado Rockies.

Lou Seal

Lou Seal is the official mascot of the San Francisco Giants. "Born" on July 25, 1996, Luigi Francisco Seal has been a regular part of the Giants baseball home games and events around San Francisco, and the United States. The name is a play on the name "Lucille." Todd Schwenk, an Oakland Athletics Fan, named the mascot in a KNBR Sports Radio phone-in contest. Schwenk named Lou for the Seals always hanging out on the wharfs at Fisherman's Wharf. It also refers to the San Francisco Seals, the baseball club which was a mainstay of the Pacific Coast League from 1903 until 1957.

Roster

Player stats

Batting

Starters by position
Note: Pos = Position; G = Games played; AB = At bats; H = Hits; Avg. = Batting average; HR = Home runs; RBI = Runs batted in

Other batters
Note: G = Games played; AB = At bats; H = Hits; Avg. = Batting average; HR = Home runs; RBI = Runs batted in

Pitching

Starting pitchers
Note: G = Games pitched; IP = Innings pitched; W = Wins; L = Losses; ERA = Earned run average; SO = Strikeouts

Other pitchers
Note: G = Games pitched; IP = Innings pitched; W = Wins; L = Losses; ERA = Earned run average; SO = Strikeouts

Relief pitchers
Note: G = Games pitched; W = Wins; L = Losses; SV = Saves; ERA = Earned run average; SO = Strikeouts

Awards and honors
 Shawon Dunston SS, Willie Mac Award
All-Star Game

Farm system

References

External links
 1996 San Francisco Giants team at Baseball-Reference
 1996 San Francisco Giants team page at Baseball Almanac

San Francisco Giants seasons
San Francisco Giants season
San Fran